Clifton is a townland in the Parish of Tomregan, Barony of Loughtee Lower, County Cavan, Ireland.

Etymology

The townland name is an anglicisation of the Gaelic placename Clochán which means 'A small beehive-shaped stone house". The 1790 Cavan Carvaghs list spells the name as Cloghan.

Geography

It is bounded on the north & east by Aghavoher townland, on the south by Breandrum, Tullyhunco and Berrymount townlands and on the west by Mullynagolman townland. Its chief geographical features are some small drumlin hills reaching to 300 feet above sea-level. Clifton is traversed by Ardlougher lane. The townland covers 82 statute acres.

History

Clifton formed part of the termon lands belonging to Tomregan Roman Catholic Church which were granted to the Protestant Bishop of Kilmore in 1610 as part of the Plantation of Ulster. By a lease dated 6 April 1612 the said bishop granted the lands to Sir Oliver Lambart of Kilbeggan, County Westmeath and Sir Garret Moore, 1st Viscount Moore of Mellifont, County Louth. On 17 July 1639 the bishop re-granted the lands to Charles Lambart, 1st Earl of Cavan. In the 1740s the bishop leased the land to John Jones for 21 years. This lease was renewed to his descendant John Copeland Jones on 20 May 1843. In the 1860s the holder of the lease was David Fielding Jones.

The Tithe Applotment Books for 1827 list the following tithepayers in the townland- Berry, Faris, Pringle.

The Ordnance Survey Name Books for 1836 give the following description of the townland- Lies in the South of the parish, 3 miles from Ballyconnell. Bishop's land. Held on lease by Jones. Lease rent 5 shillings & 6d per arable acre. The houses are built of mud. The soil produces oats and potatoes.

The Clifton Valuation Office Field books are available for December 1838.

Griffith's Valuation of 1857 lists the landlord of the townland as Jones & the tenants as Faris, Pringle and Griffith.

Census

In the 1901 census of Ireland, there are four families listed in the townland.

In the 1911 census of Ireland, there are three families listed in the townland.

Antiquities

 A Bronze-Age ring-barrow on the border with Aghavoher (Site number 94, page 20, Aghavoher townland, in "Archaeological Inventory of County Cavan", Patrick O’Donovan, 1995, where it is described as- Marked 'Fort' on OS 1836 and 1876 eds. Sited on the S slope of a steep hill. Raised circular area (int. diam. 11.8m) enclosed by a low earthen bank with a wide, deep internal fosse. The internal area is greatly disturbed by a modern field boundary running NNW-SSE which divides the site into two roughly equal portions. Original entrance not recognisable.)

References

External links
The IreAtlas Townland Data Base

Townlands of County Cavan